Entity is the fifth studio album by technical death metal band Origin. It was released through Nuclear Blast, on June 7, 2011. It was released on CD & Vinyl.

The album reached number 20 on the US Billboard Top New Artist Albums (Heatseekers).

Reception

Track listing

Personnel
 Paul Ryan - guitar, vocals
 Mike Flores - bass, vocals
 John Longstreth - drums
 Colin Marks - cover art, layout
 Robert Rebeck - engineering, mixing
 Colin Marston - mastering

References

2011 albums
Origin (band) albums
Nuclear Blast albums